Jim Lewis (born December 23, 1955) is an American writer known for his work with The Jim Henson Company and The Muppets. Lewis first worked with the Muppets as the editor of Muppet Magazine. The Disney Channel program Studio DC: Almost Live was produced by him.

Lewis grew up in Boonton, New Jersey and attended Boonton High School.

Writing credits
Wow, You're a Cartoonist! (1988)
 Hey, You're as Funny as Fozzie Bear (1988)
 The Jim Henson Hour - Miss Piggy's Hollywood (with Bill Prady) (1989)
 Muppet Sing Alongs (1993)
The Animal Show (1994-1996)
Muppet Time (1994)
Muppet Classic Theater (with Bill Prady) (1994)
Muppets Tonight (1996)
Telling Stories with Tomie dePaola (2001)
Kermit's Swamp Years (2002)
The Muppet Show Live (2001)
It's A Very Merry Muppet Christmas Movie (2002)
The Muppets Present...Great Moments in American History (2016)
 The Muppets Take the Bowl (with Kirk Thatcher, Andrew Williams and Matthew Barnette, live show at the Hollywood Bowl in 2017)
 The Muppets Take the O2 (with Kirk Thatcher, Andrew Williams and Matthew Barnette, live show at the O2 Arena in 2018)
 Muppets Now (Story Team, 2020)
 Muppets Haunted Mansion (2021)

References

External links
 The Muppet Newsflash's Interview with Jim Lewis

American male writers
American male screenwriters
American television writers
Boonton High School alumni
Living people
1955 births
People from Boonton, New Jersey
American male television writers
Screenwriters from New Jersey